Gunnera petaloidea is a species of Gunnera endemic to Hawaii on the islands Oahu, Molokai, Maui, and Hawaii. The Hawaiian name for this plant is Apé or Apé-Apé.

Description

References

petaloidea
Endemic flora of Hawaii